Daniel Ferre (born 9 November 1962) is a French sailor. He competed in the Flying Dutchman event at the 1988 Summer Olympics.

References

1962 births
Living people
French male sailors (sport)
Olympic sailors of France
Sailors at the 1988 Summer Olympics – Flying Dutchman
Place of birth missing (living people)